Harry King may refer to:

 Harry King (cricketer) (1881–1947), English cricketer
 Harry King (footballer) (1886–1968), English footballer
 Harry King (politician) (1902–1981), American politician
 Harry King (racing driver) (born 2001), English racing driver

See also 
 Henry King (disambiguation)
Harold King (disambiguation)